The 1929–30 British Ice Hockey season was the inaugural season where an organised league structure was implemented. The format consisted of a Southern and Northern British league and a Scottish League.

In the BIHA Championship the leading teams from the southern and northern leagues would play off to determine who met in the final and compete for the Patton Cup. In the final London Lions beat Glasgow 2–1 with Blaine Sexton, who had founded the London Lions in 1924, and Bushell scoring for London and Macdonald scoring for Glasgow.

The Patton cup was named after Major Peter Patton a past president of the British Ice Hockey Association. Patton had founded 'Princes' in December 1896, the first ice hockey club in Great Britain. In the 1913/14 season he also founded the British Ice Hockey Association (BIHA). The 1929/1930 season was the only time Scottish teams were linked with the Patton Cup.

Southern League
The southern league was competed for by five teams playing home and away. Oxford University and Cambridge University only played each other once in the annual varsity match which awarded double league points.

BIHA Southern League Championship semi finals

Southern Final

Northern League
The Northern League consisted of five teams from Manchester and Glasgow.

BIHA Northern League Championship Final

BIHA Grand Final (Patton Cup)

Scottish League
Ten teams first participated in the Points Competition which was played to separate the top teams from the bottom. The top five teams from the Points Competition went on to form the First Division, while the bottom five finishers were consigned to the Second Division. The Glasgow Mohawks won the championship as the top team in the First Division.

Points Competition
Scores

Table

Championship round

First Division
Scores

Table

Second Division
Scores

Table

Mitchell Trophy
The 1929–30 Mitchell Trophy was the first edition of the single-elimination cup competition contested in Scotland. The title was won by Glasgow Skating Club.

Results

References 

British